The Flag Officer Spithead  was a senior Royal Navy appointment first established in July 1971. The office holder was responsible for the command of Spithead and wider Portsmouth area command, that formed a part of Naval Home Command. The appointment continued until August 1975 when it was abolished.

History
The office of the Flag Officer Spithead  was a senior Royal Navy appointment first created in July 1971. The office holder was responsible for the command of Spithead and wider Portsmouth area command, that formed a part of Naval Home Command. The appointment continued until August 1975 when it was abolished.

Office Holders
 Rear-Admiral Peter G. La Niece, July 1971 – May 1973
 Rear-Admiral Stanley McArdle, May 1973 – August 1975.

References

Royal Navy appointments